Norman George Featherstone (born 20 August 1949) is a South African retired cricketer.

Education 
Known as "Smokey", Featherstone was educated at King Edward VII High School in Johannesburg and toured England with the South African Schools team in 1967.

Career 
Featherstone made his debut for Transvaal B as a right-handed batsman and an off-break bowler in the 1967–68 Currie Cup competition. He represented Middlesex between 1968 and 1979, being awarded his county cap in 1971. In 1976, when Middlesex won their first title for 27 years, he scored 995 runs and took 36 wickets. In his career for Middlesex, he scored 8,882 runs in 216 first-class matches with eight centuries and took 137 wickets. He later played for Glamorgan in 1980 and 1981, scoring more than 1000 runs each season.

His best first-class performances were 147 for Middlesex against Yorkshire at Scarborough in 1975 and 5 for 32 for Middlesex against Nottinghamshire at Nottingham in 1978.

After captaining Northern Transvaal in the 1981–82 season, he retired from cricket to take up a career in sports promotions in South Africa. His positions included a management role at the Kyalami Formula One circuit near Johannesburg.

References

External links
 

1949 births
Living people
Sportspeople from Kwekwe
Zimbabwean people of English descent
Zimbabwean emigrants to South Africa
White Rhodesian people
Gauteng cricketers
Glamorgan cricketers
Middlesex cricketers
Northerns cricketers
South African cricketers
T. N. Pearce's XI cricketers